The E-113 was a small flat-twin piston engine developed by Aeronca for use in some of their light aircraft. It was an overhead valve development of the flathead configuration E-107.

Design and development
Originally fitted with a single ignition system, this was uprated to dual ignition when changes in FAA regulations made this mandatory in 1939. By that time, however, both the engine and the aircraft that it powered were facing obsolescence. Altogether, some 1,800 examples were built.
Following an incident in October 2015 where the propeller detached from an Aeronca C3 in 2015, the Light Aircraft Association has issued an advisory that all aircraft fitted with these engines have the crankshaft attachment inspected prior to flying again.
This issue has been recognised since 1939.

Variants
E-113AStandard production model delivering 36-45 hp (26.85 - 33.56 kW)
E-113CUprated engine delivering 40-45 hp (29.83 - 33.56 kW)
Aeronca-JAP J-99The E-113-C was license built in England as the Aeronca-JAP J-99 by J A Prestwich Limited (JAP) and powered several British aircraft types, differing from the E-113 by being fitted with dual ignition.
O-113Engines fitted to impressed aircraft were given the designation O-113.

Applications

E-113
 Aeronca C-3
 Aeronca K
 Welch OW-6M

J-99
 Aeronca 100
 Aeronca 300
 Britten-Norman BN-1
 Currie Wot
 Dart Kitten
 Hants and Sussex Aviation Herald
 Heath Parasol
 Hillson Praga
 Luton Minor
 Peterborough Ely
 Slingsby Motor Tutor
 Taylor J.T.1
 Tipsy Junior

Engines on display
An Aeronca is on public display at the Aerospace Museum of California

Specifications (E-113)

See also

References

Notes

Bibliography

 Lumsden, Alec. British Piston Engines and their Aircraft. Marlborough, Wiltshire: Airlife Publishing, 2003. .
 Trainor, Todd. Aeronca K and Aeronca Engines website
 1938 Aeronca engine manual (online copy available here)

Boxer engines
1930s aircraft piston engines